Per Albert Sætersdal (born 18 May 1964) is a Norwegian competition rower and Olympic medalist.

He received a silver medal in quadruple sculls at the 1992 Summer Olympics in Barcelona, together with Kjetil Undset, Lars Bjønness, and Rolf Thorsen.

References

1964 births
Living people
Norwegian male rowers
Olympic rowers of Norway
Olympic silver medalists for Norway
Rowers at the 1988 Summer Olympics
Rowers at the 1992 Summer Olympics
Olympic medalists in rowing
Medalists at the 1992 Summer Olympics
World Rowing Championships medalists for Norway